Tsʼil Kaz Koh First Nation or the Burns Lake Indian Band is a Wetsuweten band government whose main community is located on Burns Lake, near the divide between the Bulkley and Nechako River basins, approximately 220 km west of Prince George, British Columbia, Canada. 
Tsʼil Kaz Koh as a name is derived from the Carrier name for the creek that runs through the area. The band has four reserves, totalling about 184.6 hectares, and as of August 2007, they had 114 band members. As of 2013, the Burns Lake Band has about 129 members on and off reserve.

Tsʼil Kaz Koh is a member of the Carrier Sekani Tribal Council. The Burns Lake Band offices are located at 653 Highway 16 west in Burns Lake, BC.

Chief and Council

One chief and two councillors are elected by the band members in elections which are held every four years, usually in the month of October. A by-election can happen at any point in order to replace either the chief or a councillor for the remainder of the term. The next election is set for 2024. The current chief and counsel consist of the following,
 Chief Wesley Sam - Elected in a by-election held in 2022
 Councillor Cecelia Sam - Elected in an election held in October 2020
 Councillor Ellen Lorentz - Elected in an election held in October 2020.

Key Oh Lodge

In 2016 the band started construction on a 42 bedroom lodge located in Burns Lake. The lodge will feature a business center, breakfast café as well as a two-story lobby. As of August 2016 construction was still underway. On January 15, 2017, the band announced the 
completion of Key-Oh Lodge on their Facebook page. "Come on down Saturday to our open house and check it out!"

References

External links
Ts'il Kaz Koh First Nation at the CSTC website.

Dakelh governments
Nechako Country